A number of steamships were named Inchmull, including

, a Hong Kong cargo ship in service 1946–48.
, a Hong Kong cargo ship in service 1949–53.
, a Hong Kong cargo ship in service 1953–69

Ship names